Camp is an aesthetic style and sensibility that regards something as appealing because of its bad taste and ironic value. Camp aesthetics disrupt many of modernism's notions of what art is and what can be classified as high art by inverting aesthetic attributes such as beauty, value, and taste through an invitation of a different kind of apprehension and consumption.

Camp can also be a social practice and function as a style and performance identity for several types of entertainment including film, cabaret, and pantomime. Where high art necessarily incorporates beauty and value, camp necessarily needs to be lively, audacious and dynamic. The visual style is closely associated with gay culture. 

Camp art is related to and often confused with kitsch and things with camp appeal may be described as cheesy. In 1909, Oxford English Dictionary defined camp as "ostentatious, exaggerated, affected, theatrical; effeminate or homosexual" behavior, and by the middle of the 1970s, camp was defined by the college edition of Webster's New World Dictionary as "banality, mediocrity, artifice, [and] ostentation ... so extreme as to amuse or have a perversely sophisticated appeal". The American writer Susan Sontag's essay Notes on "Camp" (1964) emphasized its key elements as: "artifice, frivolity, naïve middle-class pretentiousness, and shocking excess".

Origins and development 
In 1870, the crossdresser Frederick Park referred to his "campish undertakings" in a letter produced in evidence at his examination before a magistrate at Bow-street, London, on suspicion of illegal homosexual acts; the letter does not make clear what these were. In 1909, the Oxford English Dictionary gave the first print citation of camp as

According to the dictionary, this sense is "etymologically obscure". Camp in this sense has been suggested to have possibly derived from the French term se camper, meaning "to pose in an exaggerated fashion". Later, it evolved into a general description of the aesthetic choices and behavior of working-class gay men. The concept of camp was described by Christopher Isherwood in 1954 in his novel The World in the Evening, and then in 1964 by Susan Sontag in her essay and book Notes on "Camp".

The rise of post-modernism made camp a common perspective on aesthetics, not identified with any specific group.  The camp perspective was originally a distinctive aspect of pre-Stonewall gay culture , where it was the dominant idiom. It originated from the understanding of gayness as effeminacy. Two key components of camp were originally feminine performances: swish and drag. With swish featuring extensive use of superlatives, and drag being exaggerated female impersonation, camp became extended to all things "over the top", including women posing as female impersonators (faux queens), as in the exaggerated Hollywood character of Carmen Miranda. It was this version of the concept that was adopted by literary and art critics and became a part of the conceptual array of 1960s culture. Moe Meyer still defines camp as "queer parody".

Contemporary culture

Television 
The Comedy Central television show Strangers with Candy (1999–2000), starring comedian Amy Sedaris, was a camp spoof of the ABC Afterschool Special genre. Inspired by the work of George Kuchar and his brother Mike Kuchar, ASS Studios began making a series of short, no-budget camp films. Their feature film Satan, Hold My Hand (2013) features many elements recognized in camp pictures.

Film 
Famous representatives of camp films are, for example, John Waters (Pink Flamingos, 1972) and Rosa von Praunheim (The Bed Sausage, 1971), who mainly used this style in the 1970s, created films which achieved a cult status.

Music 

American singer and actress Cher is one of the artists who received the title of "Queen of Camp" through her outrageous on-stage fashion and live performances. She gained this status in the 1970s when she launched her variety shows in collaboration with the costume designer Bob Mackie and became a constant presence on American prime-time television. Madonna is another example of camp and according to educator Carol Queen, her "whole career up to and including Sex has depended heavily on camp imagery and camp understandings of gender and sex". By some point of her career, Madonna was also named "Queen of Camp".

Dusty Springfield is a camp icon. In public and on stage, Springfield developed a joyful image supported by her peroxide blonde beehive hairstyle, evening gowns, and heavy make-up that included her much-copied "panda eye" look. Springfield borrowed elements of her look from blonde glamour queens of the 1950s, such as Brigitte Bardot and Catherine Deneuve, and pasted them together according to her own taste. Her ultra-glamorous look made her a camp icon and this, combined with her emotive vocal performances, won her a powerful and enduring following in the gay community. Besides the prototypical female drag queen, she was presented in the roles of the "Great White Lady" of pop and soul and the "Queen of Mods". South Korean rapper Psy, known for his viral internet music videos full of flamboyant dance and visuals, has come to be seen as a 21st-century incarnation of camp style. Geri Halliwell is recognised as a camp icon for her high camp aesthetics, performance style and kinship with the gay community during her time as a solo artist.

Lady Gaga, a contemporary exemplar of camp, uses music and dance to make social commentary on pop culture, as in the Judas video. Her clothes, makeup, and accessories, created by high-end fashion designers, are integral to the narrative structure of her performances. Katy Perry is another example of camp with outlets like Vogue describing her as the "Queen of Camp"..

Distinguishing between kitsch and camp 
The words "camp" and "kitsch" are often used interchangeably; both may relate to art, literature, music, or any object that carries an aesthetic value. However, "kitsch" refers specifically to the work itself, whereas "camp" is a mode of performance. Thus, a person may consume kitsch intentionally or unintentionally. Camp, as Susan Sontag observed, is always a way of consuming or performing culture "in quotation marks".

Sontag also distinguishes between "naive" and "deliberate" camp, and examines Christopher Isherwood's distinction between low camp, which he associated with cross-dressing practices and drag performances, and high camp, which included "the whole emotional basis of the Ballet, for example, and of course of Baroque art".

According to sociologist Andrew Ross, camp combines outmoded and contemporary forms of style, fashion, and technology. Often characterized by the reappropriation of a "throwaway Pop aesthetic", camp works to intermingle the categories of "high" and "low" culture. Objects may become camp objects because of their historical association with a power now in decline. As opposed to kitsch, camp reappropriates culture in an ironic fashion, whereas kitsch is indelibly sincere. Additionally, kitsch may be seen as a quality of an object, while camp, "tends to refer to a subjective process". Those who identify objects as "camp" commemorate the distance mirrored in the process through which, "unexpected value can be located in some obscure or exorbitant object."

In the Western World 
Comedian Kenneth Williams wrote in a diary entry for 1 January 1947: "Went to Singapore with Stan—very camp evening, was followed, but tatty types so didn't bother to make overtures." Although it applies to gay men, it is a specific adjective used to describe a man who openly promotes the fact that he is gay by being outwardly garish or eccentric, for example, the character Daffyd Thomas in the English comedy skit show Little Britain. "Camp" forms a strong element in UK culture, and many so-called gay icons and objects are chosen as such because they are camp. Performers such as Elton John Kylie Minogue, John Inman, Lawrence Llewelyn Bowen, Lulu, Graham Norton, Mika, Lesley Joseph, Ruby Wax, Dale Winton and Cilla Black, as well as the music hall tradition of the pantomime are camp elements in popular culture. The British tradition of the "Last Night of the Proms" has been said to glory in "nostalgia, camp, and pastiche". Thomas Dworzak published a collection of "last portrait" photographs of young Taliban soldiers about to depart for the front, found in Kabul photo studios. The book, titled Taliban, attests to a campy esthetic, quite close to the gay movement in California or a Peter Greenaway film.

The Australian theatre and opera director Barrie Kosky is renowned for his use of camp in interpreting the works of the Western canon, including Shakespeare, Wagner, Molière, Seneca and Kafka; his 2006 eight-hour production for the Sydney Theatre Company The Lost Echo was based on Ovid's Metamorphoses and Euripides's The Bacchae. In the first act ("The Song of Phaeton"), for instance, the goddess Juno takes the form of a highly stylized Marlene Dietrich, and the musical arrangements feature Noël Coward and Cole Porter. Kosky's use of camp is also effectively employed to satirize the pretensions, manners, and cultural vacuity of Australia's suburban middle class, which is suggestive of the style of Dame Edna Everage. For example, in The Lost Echo Kosky employs a chorus of high school girls and boys: one girl in the chorus takes leave from the goddess Diana, and begins to rehearse a dance routine, muttering to herself in a broad Australian accent, "Mum says I have to practice if I want to be on Australian Idol." Australian writer/director Baz Luhrmann, in particular "Strictly Ballroom", constitutes another example.

Since 2000, the Eurovision Song Contest, an annually televised competition of song performers from different countries, has shown an increasing element of camp—since the contest has shown an increasing attraction within the gay communities—in their stage performances, especially during the televised finale, which is screened live across Europe. As it is a visual show, many Eurovision performances attempt to attract the attention of the voters through means other than the music, which sometimes leads to bizarre onstage gimmicks, and what some critics have called "the Eurovision kitsch drive", with almost cartoonish novelty acts performing.

The 2019 Met Gala's theme was Camp: Notes on Fashion, co-chaired by Anna Wintour, Serena Williams, Lady Gaga, Harry Styles, and Alessandro Michele. Lady Gaga's entrance took 16 minutes, as she arrived to the gala alongside an entourage of five dancers carrying umbrellas, a make up artist, and a personal photographer to snap pictures of Gaga's poses. Gaga arrived in a hot pink Brandon Maxwell gown with a 25-foot train and went through a series of four "reveals," paying homage to drag culture, debuting a new outfit each time, until reaching her final look: a bra and underwear with fishnets and platform heels. Other notable ensembles included Katy Perry wearing a gown that looked like a chandelier, designed by Moschino, and Kacey Musgraves appearing as a life-size Barbie, also by Moschino.

Literature 
The first post-World War II use of the word in print may be Christopher Isherwood's 1954 novel The World in the Evening, where he comments: "You can't camp about something you don't take seriously. You're not making fun of it; you're making fun out of it. You're expressing what's basically serious to you in terms of fun and artifice and elegance."  In the American writer Susan Sontag's 1964 essay Notes on "Camp", Sontag emphasized artifice, frivolity, naïve middle-class pretentiousness, and shocking excess as key elements of camp. Examples cited by Sontag included Tiffany lamps, the drawings of Aubrey Beardsley, Tchaikovsky's ballet Swan Lake, and Japanese science fiction films such as Rodan, and The Mysterians of the 1950s.

In Mark Booth's 1983 book Camp, he defines camp as "to present oneself as being committed to the marginal with a commitment greater than the marginal merits". He makes a distinction between genuine camp, and camp fads and fancies, things that are not intrinsically camp, but display artificiality, stylization, theatricality, naivety, sexual ambiguity, tackiness, poor taste, stylishness, or portray camp people, and thus appeal to them.

See also 

Avant-garde
Asemic writing
Collection de l'art brut
David Bowie's art collection and Outside (1995)
Glam rock
Horror vacui
Lille Métropole Museum of Modern, Contemporary and Outsider Art
Lowbrow (art movement)
Neo-pop
Neurodiversity
Outsider art
Outsider music
Pop art
Postmodernism
Psychedelic art
The Rocky Horror Picture Show
Saving and Preserving Arts and Cultural Environments
Surrealism
Unilalianism
Vaporwave
Vernacular architecture

References

Sources 

 Babuscio, Jack (1993) "Camp and the Gay Sensibility" in Camp Grounds: Style and Homosexuality, David Bergman Ed., U of Massachusetts, Amherst 
 Feil, Ken (2005) "Queer Comedy", in Comedy: A Geographic and Historical Guide Vol. 2. pp. 19–38, 477–492, Maurice Charney Ed., Praeger, Westport, CN 
 Levine, Martin P. (1998) Gay Macho, New York UP, New York 
 Meyer, Moe, Ed. (1994) The Politics and Poetics of Camp, Routledge, London and New York 
 Morrill, Cynthia (1994) "Revamping the Gay Sensibility: Queer Camp and dyke noir" (In Meyer pp. 110–129)
 Helene A. Shugart and Catherine Egley Waggoner (2008) Making Camp: Rhetorics of Transgression in U.S. Popular Culture, U of Alabama P., Tuscaloosa 
 Van Leer, David (1995) The Queening of America: Gay Culture in Straight Society, Routledge, London and New York

Further reading 

 Core, Philip (1984/1994). CAMP, The Lie That Tells the Truth, foreword by George Melly. London: Plexus Publishing Limited. 
 Cleto, Fabio, editor (1999). Camp: Queer Aesthetics and the Performing Subject. Ann Arbor: University of Michigan Press. .
 Padva, Gilad (2008). "Educating The Simpsons: Teaching Queer Representations in Contemporary Visual Media". Journal of LGBT Youth 5(3), 57–73.
 Padva, Gilad and Talmon, Miri (2008). "Gotta Have An Effeminate Heart: The Politics of Effeminacy and Sissyness in a Nostalgic Israeli TV Musical". Feminist Media Studies 8(1), 69–84.
 Padva, Gilad (2005). "Radical Sissies and Stereotyped Fairies in Laurie Lynd's The Fairy Who Didn't Want To Be A Fairy Anymore". Cinema Journal 45(1), 66–78.
 Padva, Gilad (2000). "Priscilla Fights Back: The Politicization of Camp Subculture". Journal of Communication Inquiry 24(2), 216–243.
 Meyer, Moe, editor (1993). The Politics and Poetics of Camp. Routledge. .
 Sontag, Susan (1964). "Notes on Camp" in Against Interpretation and Other Essays. New York: Farrer Straus & Giroux. .

External links 
 Notes on "Camp" by Susan Sontag

1900s neologisms
Gay effeminacy
LGBT terminology
Gay working-class culture
Cultural trends
Postmodernism
Concepts in aesthetics